The Swedish Mixed Curling Championship is the national championship of mixed curling (two men and two women) in Sweden. It has been held annually since 1968.

Rules changing 
Before the 1989–90 season, the team line-up could be "free" (not necessarily "two men and two women" but "four players of any gender"). In the 1989–90 and 1990–91 seasons all four players had to have represented one curling club. Beginning with the 1991–92 season, a minimum two players must be from the same curling club.

List of champions (1968–2013)
(teams line-up in order: fourth, third, second, lead, alternate, coach; skips marked bold)

List of champions and medallists (2014–present)
(teams line-up in order: fourth, third, second, lead, alternate, coach; skips marked bold)

References

See also
Swedish Men's Curling Championship
Swedish Women's Curling Championship
Swedish Mixed Doubles Curling Championship
Swedish Junior Curling Championships
Swedish Senior Curling Championships

Curling competitions in Sweden
Recurring sporting events established in 1968
National curling championships
Swedish
Mixed curling